Rascals on the Road is a 2005 Swiss adventure film directed by Michael Steiner.
With 580,000 admissions in Switzerland it is the third most successful Swiss film of all time.

Cast 
  - Eugen
  - Wrigley
  - Bäschteli
  - Eduard
  - Fritzli Bühler
  - Vater Eugen
  - Herr von Almen
 Monika Niggeler - Mutter Eugen
  - Vater Wrigley
  - Mutter Wrigley

References

External links 

2005 films
2000s adventure films
Swiss children's films
Swiss adventure films
Swiss German-language films
Films based on Swiss novels